Papun-e Olya (also Romanized as Pāpūn-e ‘Olyā; also known as Pāpūn, Pāpūnī, and Pāpūnī Moḩammad) is a village in Kuhmareh Rural District, Kuhmareh District, Kazerun County, Fars Province, Iran. At the 2006 census, its population was 461, in 94 families.

References 

Populated places in Kazerun County